High Command of Coastal Defence was an army level command of the German Army in World War I. It served in Germany throughout its existence.

History
The High Command of Coastal Defence was set up on 14 April 1916, with headquarters in Hamburg, to guard against the possibility of an attack on the German coast (North Sea or Baltic Sea) or mainland Denmark. Its task was to maintain the coastal defences in a state of combat readiness, and to assemble a defensive army if needed. To this end, it took command of all Deputy Corps Commanders bordering the sea (I Corps District, II Corps District, IX Corps District, X Corps District) and XVII Corps District. From September 1916, it also commanded those bordering the Netherlands (VII Corps District and VIII Corps District).

On 18 September 1918, the post of Supreme Commander was discontinued; on 1 November 1918, the High Command was taken off active status and was dissolved on 24 January 1919.

Commanders
High Command of Coastal Defence had the following commanders during its existence:

Glossary
Armee-Abteilung or Army Detachment in the sense of "something detached from an Army". It is not under the command of an Army so is in itself a small Army.
Armee-Gruppe or Army Group in the sense of a group within an Army and under its command, generally formed as a temporary measure for a specific task.
Heeresgruppe or Army Group in the sense of a number of armies under a single commander.

See also

References

Bibliography 
 
 

C
Military units and formations established in 1916
Military units and formations disestablished in 1918